Shahenshah is a 2020 Bangladeshi action romantic drama film directed by Shamim Ahamed Roni. The film stars Shakib Khan, Nusrat Faria and Rodela Jannat in the lead roles. The cast also includes Misha Sawdagor, Ahmed Sharif, Amit Hasan, Shiba Shanu, and Don in supporting roles. Shapla Media produced the film.

The film was supposed to began filming on September 11, 2018. But the pre-production work was not completed and later the filming was delayed. The principal photography of the film was begun on October 23, 2018, and wrapped up on 19 December 2018. The film's soundtrack album is composed by Savvy, Dabbu, Lincon Roy Chowdhury, Imran Mahmudul. It is the 5th directorial venture of Shamim Ahamed Roni, also 4th collaboration between Shakib Khan and director and 1st between Khan and Faria. It is the first solo Bangladeshi film starring Nusraat Faria, who has previously acted few co-production films with India.

After postponed 4 times to release, the film was later released on March 6, 2020. Despite having set the release date several times, later the film was criticised for not releasing. The feature was theatrically released in Bangladesh amid the COVID-19 pandemic, which affected its commercial performance due to the closing of the cinemas.

Plot

Cast
 Shakib Khan as Shahenshah
 Nusraat Faria as Laila
 Rodela Jannat as Priya
 Misha Sawdagor
 Amit Hasan
 Sadek Bachchu
 Ahmed Sharif
 Nana Shah
 Uzzal
 Jadu Azad
 Don
 Shiba Shanu
 DJ Shohel
 Sanko Panja
 Kamol Patekar

Production

Development
The film's digital content partner is Live Technologies. Nusraat Faria's elder sister Maria Mrittika is also worked as its costume designer and Faria's makeup man.

Pre-production
In August 2018, after complete the filming of Captain Khan, The Shapla Media producer Selim Khan announced to make another film with Shakib Khan titled Shahenshah. He confirmed this to Channel i on August 5, 2018. He informed that "Shakib Khan and Nusraat Faria will be working together for the first time in the film of Shahenshah. The film will be directed by Shamim Ahamed Roni. There will be another actress in the film." The producer also informed that Shakib Khan and Nusraat Faria will sign a contract for the film on August 5, 2018. Then on August 7, director Shamim Ahamed Roni confirmed the news of his involvement with the film through a Facebook post. Later on September 5, 2018, the film's official Muharat was held in Dhaka, where besides Shakib Khan and Nusraat Faria, newcomer Rodela Jannat's name were also announced. According to Channel i, model-turned-actress Tanjin Tisha was supposed to work with Nusraat Faria in the film before Rodela Jannat. Primarily, Tanjin Tisha agreed to work in the film, but later withdrew herself. Later, Rodela Jannat was confirmed for the film instead of Tisha.

Filming
Shahenshah was supposed to began filming on September 11, 2018, in Cox's Bazar. But the pre-production work was not completed and the filming was delayed. The principal photography of the film was begun on October 23, 2018, at Bangladesh Film Development Corporation. The first lot was filmed till November 3, 2018. The shooting of the film completed on 19 December 2018 in Pubail, Dhaka, where Shakib Khan, Nusraat Faria, Rodela Jannat and the entire unit of the film took part. Earlier, several lots were shot in different locations of Dhaka including BFDC, Aftab Nagar. A song scene with Shakib Khan-Faria was filmed at BFDC from February 1–4, 2019 and other song scenes with Shakib Khan-Rodela were shot at different locations in Cox's Bazar on 5–6 February 2019. All the songs were choreographed by Baba Yadav from India.

Soundtrack

The soundtrack of Shahenshah is composed by Savvy, Dabbu, Lincon Roy Chowdhury and Imran. The first song from the soundtrack was revealed on February 25, 2019, and sung by Savvy and Kona. The first stanza of this song titled "Roshik Amar" is collected. The rest is written by Priyo Bhattacharya and music composed and arranged by Savvy. Also the song is  choreographed by Indian Baba Yadav. Within 48 hours of its release, the song was viewed by over 1.6 million viewers on YouTube. The second song from the soundtrack titled "Premer Raja" sung by Imran and Kona was released on March 21, 2019.The song is composed by Dabbu and written by Prasenjit Mallick. The third song from the soundtrack titled "O Priya" sung by Ashok Singh, released on 25 August 2019, which written and composed by Lincon Roy Chowdhury. The four and final song titled "Tui Ami Chol" released on 13 September 2019 sung Imran and Atiya Anisha. Which is composed by Imran himself and written by Snehasish Ghosh. Another song "Her Drama" collected from Spotify which was created by TAnvir Ahmed Anontow and released on October 26, 2020. All the songs from the soundtrack were released on its digital content partner Live Technologies' YouTube channel Unlimited Audio Video.

Promotion and release
The first promotional first look teaser of the film was released on January 25, 2019. Its first look poster was revealed on March 11, 2019. The film was cleared by the Bangladesh Film Censor Board without any cuts on 12 March 2019. The second poster of the film made by Sajjadul Islam Sayem was revealed on 16 March 2019. Its official trailer was released on 1 April 2019, which has over 2.4 million views on YouTube, as of July 2021.

Release
The film initially scheduled for a release on the occasion of 15 February 2019, a day after Valentine's Day, but was postponed for the film's promotion and rescheduled to release on the occasion of 2019 Eid al-Fitr. Later, as a result of the release of Shakib Khan's film Password on Eid al-Fitr, the film's release date was again postponed and it was rescheduled to release on the occasion of 2019 Eid al-Adha. The production company Shapla Media rescheduled set to release on 4 October 2019, but also postponed it due to political unrest in the country. Producer Selim Khan said that it will be released on the occasion of 2020 Eid al-Fitr. After postponed 4 times to release, the film was later released on March 6, 2020, in 77 theaters across Bangladesh.

References

External links 
 

Bengali-language Bangladeshi films
Bangladeshi romantic comedy films
Bangladeshi romantic action films
2020s Bengali-language films
Films directed by Shamim Ahamed Roni
2020 romantic drama films
2020 action drama films
Shapla Media films